Ctenochaetus flavicauda is a tang from the Pacific Ocean. It occasionally makes its way into the aquarium trade. It grows to a size of 11.8 cm (4.6 in) in length, making it the smallest ctenochaetus tang, and also the smallest acanthurid.  As a juvenile it is a bright yellow color, as an adult it is reddish-brown color with orange-colored fine horizontal striping, the tail is white and the eye is ringed by bright yellow.

The species was first described in 1938 by Henry W. Fowler from a specimen collected near Takaroa in 1937 by the George Vanderbilt South Pacific Expedition.

References

External links
 

Acanthuridae
Fish described in 1938